The 2010 FIBA Europe Under-20 Championship for Women Division B was the sixth edition of the Division B of the Women's European basketball championship for national under-20 teams. It was held in Kavadarci, Republic of Macedonia, from 16 to 25 July 2010. Great Britain women's national under-20 basketball team won the tournament.

Participating teams

  (15th place, 2009 FIBA Europe Under-20 Championship for Women Division A)

First round
In the first round, the teams were drawn into two groups of five. The first four teams from each group advance to the quarterfinals, the last teams will play for the 9th place.

Group A

Group B

9th place playoff

Championship playoffs

Quarterfinals

5th–8th place playoffs

Semifinals

7th place match

5th place match

3rd place match

Final

Final standings

References

2010
2010–11 in European women's basketball
International youth basketball competitions hosted by North Macedonia
FIBA U20
July 2010 sports events in Europe